The 1950 Toronto Argonauts season was the 61st season for the team since the franchise's inception in 1873. The team finished in second place in the Interprovincial Rugby Football Union with a 6–5–1 record and qualified for the playoffs for the first time since their Grey Cup win in 1947. The Argonauts defeated the Hamilton Tiger-Cats in a two-game total-points IRFU Final series before winning the Eastern Final over the Toronto Balmy Beach Beachers. The Argonauts faced the Winnipeg Blue Bombers at Varsity Stadium in the Grey Cup for the fourth time in six years in the now-infamous Mud Bowl. Toronto won their ninth Grey Cup by a score of 13–0 in what is currently the last time a team was shut out in championship game.

Preseason

Regular season

Standings

Schedule

Postseason

Grey Cup

November 25 @ Varsity Stadium (Attendance: 27,101)

References

Toronto Argonauts seasons
Grey Cup championship seasons
1950 Canadian football season by team